Palácio da Justiça is a palace government building in Porto, Portugal. It was built in 1958.

References

Buildings and structures in Porto
Government buildings in Portugal
Government buildings completed in 1958

всё что я знаю, это дворец правосудия 
\